Elections to Liverpool Town Council were held on Monday 1 November 1872. One third of the council seats were up for election, the term of office of each councillor being three years.

The Ballot Act 1872 received Royal Assent on 18 July 1872, introducing the 
Secret Ballot.

Six of the sixteen wards were uncontested.

After the election, the composition of the council was:

Election result

Because of the large number of uncontested seats, these statistics should be taken in that context.

Ward results

* - Retiring Councillor seeking re-election

Abercromby

Castle Street

Everton

Exchange

Great George

Lime Street

North Toxteth

Pitt Street

Rodney Street

St. Anne Street

St. Paul's

St. Peter's

Scotland

South Toxteth

Vauxhall

West Derby

By-elections

Aldermanic By Election 6 January 1873

The death of alderman Oliver Holden was reported to the Council on 1 January 1873.

Former Councillor John Birch Melladew (Conservative, West Derby, last elected 1 November 1869) was elected as an alderman by the Council (Councillors and aldermen) on 6 January 1873.

Aldermanic By Election, 9 April 1872 

Alderman William Bennett resigned on 12 February 1873.

Thomas Carey was elected as an alderman by the Council (Councillors and Aldermen) on 9 April 1873.

No. 15, South Toxteth, 28 March 1873

The death of Councillor John Parrat (Conservative, South Toxteth, elected 1 November 1871) was reported to the Council on 24 March 1873.

No. 12, Lime Street, 22 July 1873

The death of Councillor Henry Hornby (Conservative, Lime Street, elected 1 November 1871) was reported to the Council on 6 August 1873

See also

 Liverpool City Council
 Liverpool Town Council elections 1835 - 1879
 Liverpool City Council elections 1880–present
 Mayors and Lord Mayors of Liverpool 1207 to present
 History of local government in England

References

1872
1872 English local elections
1870s in Liverpool